Top Deck was a low alcohol shandy drink available in a variety of flavours and marketed to children in the United Kingdom from the 1960s to the 1980s. It was a brand of the Beecham Group until 1986 when it was sold along with the more popular brand Tango to Britvic. The sale also included the UK franchises for Pepsi and 7-Up.

Top Deck remained available until 2012.

References

Soft drinks
Soft beers and malt drinks